Suków  is a village in the administrative district of Gmina Daleszyce, within Kielce County, Świętokrzyskie Voivodeship, in south-central Poland.

The village has 1803 persons.

References

Villages in Kielce County